Canadian Pickers (internationally known as Cash Cowboys) was a Canadian television reality series filmed in Calgary, Alberta, which currently airs reruns on History.  The show was also previously shown on DTour and Historia. The series was canceled on November 19, 2013, with the final episodes airing on December 23, 2013.

Overview
Similar in format to Cineflix's production, American Pickers, Canadian Pickers follows Scott Cozens and Sheldon Smithens as they travel across Canada looking for items in basements, garages, attics, sheds, barns, warehouses, storage units, flea markets, yard sales, and shops. Always clad in cowboy hats and Western wear, the pair make use of their folksy charm when negotiating the purchase of collectibles ranging from vintage furniture, antiques, and advertising to all things Canadiana in hopes of making a profit upon their resale.

Scott Cozens is a former electrician turned full-time attorney practising in Calgary, Alberta. He can be found spending his free time traveling across Canada pursuing his childhood passion as a picker.

Sheldon Smithers is a third-generation antiques dealer, auctioneer, and appraiser with a vast knowledge of antiques and collectibles qualifying him as a professional picker. When not on picking expeditions, Sheldon teaches continuing education courses in antiques collecting at the University of Calgary located in Calgary, Alberta.

On April 12, 2011, Season 1 of Canadian Pickers debuted on History Television (which became History in August 2012). Building on the success of the first season, Season 2 aired from January 2012 to April 2012 followed by Season 3 which began airing in August 2012.

International broadcast
The series is syndicated outside of Canada under the name Cash Cowboys:

 Australia: 7mate and A&E
 Brazil: National Geographic
 Norway: TV 2 Zebra
 Slovenia: Kanal A
 United Kingdom: History
 United States: H2

Episodes

References
{{Reflist|refs=

<ref name="CanadianPickers2011">About the Show. CanadianPickers.com, 2011.</ref>
}}

External links
Cineflix Productions website
History channel website (English Canada)
Historia channel website (French Canada)

See also
Cineflix Pickers franchiseAmerican PickersAussie PickersPicker Sisters'', a similar series with female leads based in the United States.

History (Canadian TV network) original programming
Antiques television series
2011 Canadian television series debuts
2013 Canadian television series endings
2010s Canadian reality television series
Television series by Cineflix
Television series by Corus Entertainment
Television shows filmed in Calgary